Palash Sarkar (born 28 September 1969) is an Indian mathematician and a professor at the Applied Statistics Unit at the Indian Statistical Institute. His main research interest is Cryptology.

He was awarded in 2011  Shanti Swarup Bhatnagar Prize for Science and Technology, the highest science award in India,  in the mathematical sciences category.

References

External links
Palash Sarkar - Indian Statistical Institute

1969 births
20th-century Indian mathematicians
Living people
Academic staff of the Indian Statistical Institute
Indian Statistical Institute alumni
Recipients of the Shanti Swarup Bhatnagar Award in Mathematical Science
Scientists from West Bengal